Lieutenant General Sir David Peel Yates KCB CVO DSO OBE (10 July 1911 – 8 October 1978) was a senior British Army officer who served in the Second World War and reached high office during the 1960s.

Early life and education
Peel Yates was the son of Hubert Peel Yates and brother of Captain Colin Peel Yates of the Royal Navy. He was educated at Haileybury College and the Royal Military College, Sandhurst.

Military career
Yates was commissioned as a second lieutenant into the South Wales Borderers, a line infantry regiment of the  British Army, in which his father had served, in 1931. He was deployed on Waziristan operations on the North West Frontier of India in 1937 before becoming adjutant of the 1st Battalion, Monmouthshire Regiment, a Territorial Army (TA) unit, in 1939.

He served in the Second World War, initially as brigade major of the 113th Infantry Brigade in 1940. He then went to the Staff College, Camberley before becoming brigade major of the 204th Independent Infantry Brigade (Home) in 1941. He served as a general staff officer (GSO) with the 4th Division and then at First Army Headquarters. He was involved in the fall of Tunis in May 1943. He was appointed commanding officer (CO) of the 6th Battalion, Lincolnshire Regiment which was deployed to the Italian Front in 1943 before he returned to the 4th Division later that year. He was a brigadier on the General Staff of General Sir Harold Alexander at Allied Force Headquarters (AFHQ) in Italy in 1945.

After the war, Peel Yates became an instructor at the Joint Services Staff College (JSSC) in 1946 and then assistant adjutant and quartermaster general at the War Office in 1949. He was an instructor at the NATO (North Atlantic Treaty Organisation) Defence College in Paris, France, between 1951 and 1953 when he became CO of the 1st Battalion, South Wales Borderers. He was appointed commander of the 27th Infantry Brigade in Hong Kong, China, in 1955 and Assistant Commandant at the Staff College, Camberley in 1957. He then became chief of staff for Eastern Command in 1960 and Commandant of the British Sector in Berlin in 1962. During the visit of John F. Kennedy to West Berlin in June 1963, Yates explained to the U.S. president the Cold War topography of the city, marked by the Berlin Wall, while both were standing on an observation platform facing the Brandenburg Gate. He was General Officer Commanding-in-Chief (GOC-in-C) for Eastern Command from 1966 to 1968, when he became GOC-in-C for Southern Command; he retired in 1969.

Family
In 1947, he married Christine Hilary Williams, daughter of Horatio Stanley Williams; they had a son and a daughter.

References

 

|-
 

|-
 

|-

 

|-
 

1911 births
1978 deaths
People educated at Haileybury and Imperial Service College
Graduates of the Royal Military College, Sandhurst
British Army lieutenant generals
British Army personnel of World War II
Commanders of the Royal Victorian Order
Companions of the Distinguished Service Order
Graduates of the Staff College, Camberley
Knights Commander of the Order of the Bath
Officers of the Order of the British Empire
Royal Lincolnshire Regiment officers
South Wales Borderers officers
People from Gillingham, Kent
Academics of the Staff College, Camberley
Military personnel from Kent
British expatriates in France
British expatriates in Hong Kong